The Lir National Academy of Dramatic Art is an Irish drama school that offers conservatory training for theatre, film and television from industry professionals. The Lir Academy is located in Dublin, Ireland, and is a part of Trinity College Dublin. It is associated with the Royal Academy of Dramatic Art in London.

History 
The Lir Academy was co-founded by Danielle Ryan and Anne Mulcahy from the Cathal Ryan Trust along with Brian Singleton of Trinity College, and founding chair, Dermot McCrum, a communications and technology entrepreneur, in 2011 in response to its parent, Trinity College, discontinuing its acting course in 2007. In May 2008, a recommendation was made from the Forum on Actor Training recommending  the creation of a national academy of dramatic art to provide university accredited education. The Cathal Ryan Trust funded a purpose-built premises for the Lir,  located in Grand Canal Dock in Dublin.

In 2017, The Lir had an annual income of €2.1 million and staged 10 theatre shows, an opera production, two short films, a design exhibition and an industry showcase.

Courses 
The Lir provides conservatoire training with degrees in acting, stage management and technical theatre, along with Masters in Fine Art for playwriting, theatre directing and stage design. The school also offers short courses and diploma programs in a range of performing arts disciplines. The Bachelor In Acting, is a three-year degree course for approximately sixteen students per year, has auditions in Ireland and abroad. The academy offers practical training for actors based in part on the acting technique of Konstantine Stanislavski, in combination with training in voice and movement. .

Notable people

Danielle Ryan, co-founder

Alumni 
Cameron Cuffe
Kwaku Fortune
Danielle Galligan
Éanna Hardwicke
Lauren-Shannon Jones
Patrick Martins
Paul Mescal
Alex Murphy
Agnes O'Casey
Ruairi O'Connor
Alison Oliver
John Reardon

References

2011 establishments in Ireland
Arts in Dublin (city)
Drama schools in Ireland
Educational institutions established in 2011
Trinity College Dublin